The third season of Beauty & the Beast (an American television series developed by Sherri Cooper-Landsman and Jennifer Levin and very loosely inspired by the 1987 CBS television series of the same name) consisted of 13 episodes. It aired in the United States on The CW starting June 11, 2015.

Plot

Following the events of the season two finale, Vincent and Catherine can finally expose their relationship to the world. Vincent and Catherine will be living as a couple, but the challenge this season will be whether they can keep outside forces from tearing them apart. Season three will have a stronger focus on family, with Heather Chandler being a more prominent character and the viewers being introduced to two of Catherine's aunts. The show's costume designer Catherine Ashton announced via Twitter that the third season will reportedly end with some closure and a big cliffhanger.

Cast

Main
Kristin Kreuk as Catherine "Cat" Chandler
Jay Ryan as Vincent Keller
Austin Basis as J.T. Forbes
Nina Lisandrello as Tess Vargas
Nicole Gale Anderson as Heather Chandler

Recurring
Jason Gedrick as Liam Cullen
Brennan Brown as Captain Ward
Zach Appelman as Alton Finn
Gloria Votsis as Julianna Keaton
Ted Whittall as Bob Reynolds
Arnold Pinnock as Agent Jack Thomas
Alan van Sprang as Bob Hall
Natasha Henstridge as Carol Hall
Wendy Crewson as Helen Ellingsworth
Pat Mastroianni as Agent Russo
Khaira Ledeyo as Dr. Vanessa Chandler

Production
On May 8, 2014, Beauty & the Beast was renewed for a third season of 13 episodes. Filming on season three commenced on August 29, 2014, and ended on February 12, 2015. Season three was originally set to premiere on May 21, 2015, but the premiere date was later moved by The CW to June 11, 2015.

Casting
Nicole Gale Anderson, who has been recurring as Heather Chandler for the past two seasons, was upgraded to series regular for season three. Alan Van Sprang and Natasha Henstridge played recurring characters this season Bob and Carol, married Professional Homeland Security Agents whose relationship mirrors that of Vincent and Catherine's. Charlotte Arnold guest starred in the season premiere as Marissa, a distraught Midwestern woman whose stockbroker husband suddenly begins displaying erratic, violent behavior. Jason Gedrick also appeared this season as Liam, who poses a threat to Catherine and Vincent. Brandon Gill guest starred as Detective Wesley Atchison in the 5th episode of the season when Cat was assigned a new partner.

Episodes

Reception

U.S. Nielsen ratings

DVD release

References

2015 American television seasons
Season